Rekhitha R. Kurup, better known by her stage name Bhamaa, is a former Indian actress who mainly appeared in Malayalam and Kannada-language films. She made her cinematic debut in 2007 with the Malayalam film Nivedyam,  directed by A. K. Lohithadas and had acted in over 42 films.

Personal life
Bhama is the youngest daughter of Rajendra Kurup & Shylaja. She has two elder sisters, Reshmitha R Kurup and Renjitha R Kurup. 

Bhama did her schooling at St. Mary's Higher Secondary School, Manarcad, and at Infant Jesus Bethany Covent Girl's Higher Secondary School, Manarcad. She pursued bachelors in Sociology by correspondence course.

Bhama is married to Arun Jagadish, a businessman from Chennithala, whose family is settled in Kochi, Kerala.
The couple got married in January 2020. They have a daughter.

Career
Before her entry into the film industry, she was the host of a show on Surya TV titled Thaali. She has also acted in a Christian devotional album. Director Lohithadas, selected her as the lead heroine, in Nivedyam, her first movie. Her second film was Hareendran Oru Nishkalankan directed by Vinayan, in which she was cast opposite Manikuttan. She paired with Vineeth Sreenivasan in Cycle directed by Johny Antony.

Bhama said that until 2011, she was getting the same kind of roles in Malayalam. She started taking up Kannada film offers, after which she started getting fresh and interesting characters in Malayalam. She acted in Sohanlal's Kadhaveedu, where she played the heroine in M. T. Vasudevan Nair's segment and her character was that of a modern girl, a media person, who is smart and energetic. She had a small but significant role in Vinod Vijayan's segment of D Company, Day of Judgement, featuring Fahadh Faasil where she played a psycho and wore no make-up.

In 2014, she had five Malayalam releases. She played a Christian housewife in Rakesh Gopan's 100 Degree Celsius and was seen as a 15-year-old mother in Vinod Mankara's Ottamandaram. In her only non-Malayalam release of the year, the Tamil-English biographical film Ramanujan based on the mathematician Srinivasa Ramanujan, she played the role of Janakiammal, Ramanujan's wife.

Playback singing
Bhama has occasionally worked as a playback singer as well. She had reportedly sung the song "Kannil Kannil", composed by Rahul Raj for a film titled Bike; however the film was cancelled and the song remains unreleased. She lent her voice for the devotional album Maaya Madhavam (2009), and has sung the title song for the upcoming children's film Meow Meow Karimppoocha. She did voice over for the short film ; Pacha directed by Sarayu.
She has sung a song in the movie 100 Degree Celsius along with other heroines Ananya, Meghana Raj and Shwetha Menon.

Awards
2007 – Asianet Film Award for Best Star Pair Award, Nivedyam (shared with Vinu Mohan)
2007 – Sathyan Memorial Film Award for Best Newcomer – Nivedyam
2007 – Film Critics Award for Best Newcomer – Nivedyam
2007 – Ala Award for Best Actress – Nivedyam
2007 – Vanitha Nippon Award for Best Newcomer – Nivedyam
2009 – Mathrubhumi-Amritha Award for Best Screen Pair – Ivar Vivahitharayal (shared with Jayasurya)

Filmography

Television
 Greet n gift (Cabinet)
Thaali (Surya TV)
Kerala Samajam (Asianet) - 2019
Comedy Stars (Asianet) 
Star Magic (Flowers)

References

External links

 

Living people
Actresses from Kottayam
21st-century Indian actresses
Actresses in Malayalam cinema
Actresses in Tamil cinema
Actresses in Kannada cinema
Actresses in Telugu cinema
Indian film actresses
Indian women television presenters
Indian television presenters
Television personalities from Kerala
Actresses in Malayalam television
Indian television actresses
1989 births
St. Teresa's College alumni